Extractor may refer to:

Extractor (firearms)
Extractor (mathematics)
Extractor (screws), a tool used to remove broken screws
Randomness extractor
Soxhlet extractor
Exhaust manifold